Peter Evrard (born 19 October 1974) is the winner of the first season of Idool 2003, the Belgian version of Pop Idol.

Evrard defied the traditional rules of the Idols series by singing rock music instead of the expected pop. Regardless, he managed to win the series, and in 2003 he placed third overall in the World Idol contest. Evrard lives and works in Beerse, Belgium. He is married and has 2 sons and a daughter. He is the only one of the original 11 World Idols to lose their mother early in life.

In 2005, Peter began recording music again with his band Toner on the CD Radio Honolulu. The song "Let Me Take You Through the Night" was used for the soundtrack of Flikken, a popular Belgian television series.

In 2007, he recorded, together with Sofie Van Moll, the new theme for the Belgian soap opera Thuis.

In 2014, he joined the band 10Rogue, and their first single Know Better was released in September 2015.

In January 2016 they released their second single Dark Angel Princess.

Discography
2003: Idool 2003: Greatest Moments
2003: Rhubarb
"For You"
"Loserman"
"Making It Beautiful"
2005: Radio Honolulu
"Let Me Take You Through The Night"
"Deaf Dumb Blind"
2006: Eurosong '06
"Coward"
2015: 10Rogue
"Know Better"
2016: 10Rogue 
"Dark Angel Princess"

Idol 2003 performances
 Antwerp Auditions: "My Own Ground"
 Theatre Round Day One: "I'm Thinking About Your Soul"
 Theatre Round Day Two: "Uptown Girl" by Billy Joel
 Theatre Round Day Three: "Faith" by George Michael
 Top 50: "How You Remind Me" by Nickelback
 Top 10: Lithium by Nirvana
 Top 9: "If You Don't Know Me By Now" by Simply Red
 Top 8: "Van God Los" by Monza
 Top 7: "Hero" by Chad Kroeger & Josey Scott
 Top 6: "Don't Walk Away"
 Top 5: "Almost Like Being in Love" by Nat King Cole
 Top 4: "Livin' La Vida Loca" by Ricky Martin
 Top 4: "Se Bastasse Una Canzone" by Eros Ramazzotti
 Top 3: "Rockin' In The Free World" by Neil Young
 Top 3: "Never Tear Us Apart" by INXS
 Grand Final: "Lithium" by Nirvana
 Grand Final: "Have A Little Faith in Me" by John Hiatt
 Grand Final: "For You"

External links

1974 births
Living people
Idols (TV series) winners
English-language singers from Belgium
People from Turnhout
Belgian pop singers
21st-century Belgian male singers
21st-century Belgian singers